Circleville may refer to a community in the United States:

 Circleville, Indiana
 Circleville, Kansas
 Circleville, Missouri, in Cape Girardeau County
 Circleville, New York
 Circleville, Ohio
 Circleville, Pennsylvania, in Westmoreland County
 Circleville, Texas, in Williamson County
 Circleville, Utah
 Circleville, West Virginia
 Circleville, Virginia, in Loudoun County